Himanshu Malicki is an Indian actor, screenwriter and producer known for his works in Bollywood. He started his acting career with the film, Kama Sutra: A Tale of Love (1996) and gained recognition with his portrayal of Abhigyan, a wealthy Canadian industrialist in the 2001 romance Tum Bin. His other notable work includes Jungle (2000), Khwahish (2003) and Rog (2005).

Career
Himanshu began his career in music videos; most notable among them was Nusrat Fateh Ali Khan's Afreen with Lisa Ray. He later appeared in Sonu Nigam's Deewana with Sandali Sinha.

Meanwhile, he made his film debut with a role in Mira Nair's Kama Sutra: A Tale of Love (1996) and also appeared in Ram Gopal Varma's Jungle in 2000. However, his big break came as a supporting actor in  Tum Bin (2001), leading to work in several small films. His next big feature was Khwahish (2003), playing the lead opposite Mallika Sherawat, notable for its sensuality and kissing scenes.

He turned filmmaker in 2012- writing and directing, his first short feature - Q.E.D- Quod Erat Demonstradum. QED, a 45 min short featurette about a detective failing to crack a case, was well received at the festival circuit and by indie Film Industry. Malik.mov Films Pvt Ltd is a production house that he founded in 2014, under which he has directed various music videos and advertising content for numerous India based brands.

Personal life
He practices adventurous sports like paragliding, flying, and scuba diving.

He is married and the couple has a daughter. The family lives in Mumbai.

Filmography

References

External links 
 
 Himanshu Malik Filmography at Bollywood Hungama

Male actors in Hindi cinema
Indian male film actors
Living people
1973 births